The 1900–01 MHA season of the Manitoba Hockey Association was played by two teams Winnipeg Victorias and Winnipeg HC. The Victorias, as defending champions, played and defeated the Montreal Shamrocks of the Canadian Amateur Hockey League (CAHL) in a Stanley Cup challenge to bring the Stanley Cup to Manitoba.

Regular season
February 19, 1901

Victorias defeated Winnipeg 4 – 3 to win the Manitoba championship. After the season, the Victorias were presented with gold watches from the club. Honorary club president Hugh John Macdonald, former Manitoba premier, and son of former Canadian Prime Minister John A. Macdonald made a speech.

Final standings
Note: GP = Games played, W = Wins, L = Losses, T = Ties, Pts = Points

Source: Zweig

Stanley Cup challenge

Shamrocks vs. Winnipeg

In January 1901, the Winnipeg Victorias again challenged the Montreal Shamrocks for the Cup. This time, Winnipeg prevailed, sweeping the best-of-three series with scores of 4–3 and 2–1. Game two was the first overtime game in Cup history with Dan Bain scoring at the four-minute mark of the extra period.

For the series, the Shamrocks added Montreal Victorias captain Mike Grant, replacing Frank Tansey. Winnipeg added Burke Wood and Jack Marshall. For Marshall, it would be the first Stanley Cup win of his career, a career in which he would with the Cup six times, with four teams.

Game one
Winnipeg addition Burke Wood scored twice for Winnipeg to lead the team, including the winner with two minutes remaining.

Game two
Dan Bain scored late in the first half to put Winnipeg ahead. Harry Trihey tied it early in the second half. The game was tied to go to overtime. Bain scored the winner in overtime, the first Stanley Cup-winning goal scored in overtime.

Stanley Cup engraving

1901 Winnipeg Victorias

See also
 1901 CAHL season
 List of Stanley Cup champions

References

 
Notes

Manitoba Hockey Association seasons
Man